Indole-5,6-quinone is an indolequinone, a chemical compound found in the oxidative browning reaction of fruits like bananas where it is mediated by the tyrosinase type polyphenol oxidase from tyrosine and catecholamines leading to the formation of catechol melanin. Like many quinones it can undergo redox reactions via the corresponding 5,6-dihydroxyindole.

See also
 Dopachrome

References

Indolequinones